Luca Nardi was the defending champion but lost in the second round to Jack Draper.

Draper won the title after defeating Jay Clarke 6–3, 6–0 in the final.

Seeds

Draw

Finals

Top half

Bottom half

References

External links
Main draw
Qualifying draw

Città di Forlì II - 1